Hugh Forth (6 July 1610 – 20 February 1676) was an English politician who sat in the House of Commons  in 1659 and 1660.

Forth was a merchant of the City of London.  In 1659, he was elected Member of Parliament for Wigan in the Third Protectorate Parliament. He was re-elected MP for Wigan in April 1660 for the Convention Parliament but the election was declared void in July.

Forth died at the age of  65.

Forth married a daughter of John Rigby of Middleton.

References

1610 births
1676 deaths
Merchants from London
Politicians from London
17th-century merchants
English MPs 1659
English MPs 1660
17th-century English businesspeople